Pseudothyretes perpusilla is a moth of the subfamily Arctiinae. It was described by Francis Walker in 1856. It is found in Angola, Cameroon, the Democratic Republic of the Congo, Gabon, Ghana, Ivory Coast, Kenya, Nigeria, Rwanda, Sierra Leone, Tanzania, the Gambia and Uganda.

References

 

Syntomini
Moths described in 1856